Carrasco is a Spanish, Portuguese and Galician surname. It derives from a Spanish word meaning ‘holm oak’ (originally from the Latin cerrus, from a pre-Roman Celtiberian word). Notable people with the surname include:

Ada Carrasco (1912–1994), Mexican actress
Angela Carrasco (born 1954), Dominican singer
Berna Carrasco Araya (1914–2013), Chilean chess master
Carlos Carrasco (actor) (born 1948), Panamanian-American actor
Carlos Carrasco (baseball) (born 1987) American baseball player
D. J. Carrasco (born 1977), American baseball player
David Carrasco (born 1949), American scholar of Mesoamerican religions
Eduardo Carrasco (born 1940), Chilean musician and professor of philosophy
Eduardo Carrasco (footballer) (born 1972), Swiss footballer
Erik Carrasco (born 1983), Chilean basketball player
Ezequiel Carrasco (born 2002), Canadian soccer player
Felix Carrasco (born 1955), Mexican-Austrian conductor 
Francisco Antonio García Carrasco Díaz (1742–1813), Spanish soldier and Royal Governor of Chile
Francisco José Carrasco (born 1959), Spanish footballer
Héctor Carrasco (born 1969), American baseball player 
Hernán Carrasco Vivanco (born 1928), Chilean football manager
Isabel Carrasco (1955-2014), Spanish politician
Isaías Carrasco (1964–2008), Spanish Basque politician murdered by ETA
Joe Carrasco, Tex-Mex "new wave" musician
Jorge Carrasco (born 1982), Chilean footballer
José Carrasco (disambiguation) (multiple people)
Juan Carrasco (disambiguation) (multiple people)
Luis Carrasco (skeleton) (born 1963), Mexican skeleton racer
Manuel Carrasco (born 1981), Spanish singer
María Carrasco (born 1995), Spanish singer
Maruja Carrasco (1944–2018), Spanish botanist
Nancy Carrasco, Mexican physician and molecular biochemist
Nicolás Rodríguez Carrasco (1890–1940), Mexican politician and general
Pancha Carrasco (1816–1890), Costa Rican medic and national heroine
Pedro Carrasco (1943–2001), Spanish professional boxer
Raimon Carrasco (born 1924), Spanish Catalan businessman, former president of FC Barcelona
Ricardo Carrasco (born 1965), Chilean photographer
Rocío Carrasco (born 1977), Spanish television presenter and businesswoman
Servando Carrasco (born 1988), American soccer player
Yannick Carrasco (born 1993), Belgian footballer

Fictional characters:
Dr. Sanson Carrasco, character in a play within Man of La Mancha
Juan Carrasco, character in the 1964 film The Outrage

References

Spanish-language surnames
Portuguese-language surnames
Galician-language surnames